The Chirr people, are a Naga ethnic group that are mostly native to Northeast Indian state of Nagaland. They are listed as a Scheduled Tribe (STs) by India. However, due to lack of official recognition from Government of Nagaland are considered sub-tribe of Yimkhiung Nagas.

Population
According to the 2011 census, the population of the Chirr people in Nagaland was 138.

References

Scheduled Tribes of Nagaland
Naga people
Ethnic groups in Northeast India